Anastasia Sergeyevna Radzinskaya (born January 27, 2014), known online as Like Nastya, is a Russian-American YouTuber.

Content 
Anastasia's content includes, among other things, children's songs, educational entertainment, unboxings, vlogging, and roleplays. Her channels are dubbed into German, Arabic, Bangla, French, Portuguese, Hindi, Spanish, Korean, Vietnamese, and Indonesian.

History 
Anastasia was born in Krasnodar Krai, Southern Russia. She was incorrectly diagnosed with cerebral palsy, her doctors feared she might never be able to speak.

Before starting their channel, Anastasia's mother Anna owned a bridal salon in Krasnodar while her father Sergey owned a small construction company. In 2015, Anastasia's parents sold their companies, and in January 2016, they created their YouTube channel, which grew rapidly from their content. The family relocated to Miami, Florida in 2018. 

Anastasia's parents signed with multi-channel network Yoola and social media company Jellysmack. According to Forbes, Anastasia was "one of the world's fastest-growing creators, thanks to videos in seven languages" in 2019, becoming the third highest-paid YouTuber in the world, with an estimated annual income of $18 million.(₽1 billion)
>

Notes

References

External links

2014 births
Living people
People from Krasnodar
Russian YouTubers
Russian emigrants to the United States
Russian children
YouTube vloggers
Children's entertainers
YouTube channels launched in 2016
American YouTubers